Igor Kunitsyn was the defending champion, but chose not to participate.
Teymuraz Gabashvili defeated Radu Albot 6–4, 6–4 in the final to win the title.

Seeds

Draw

Finals

Top half

Bottom half

References
 Main Draw
 Qualifying Draw

2013 ATP Challenger Tour
2013 Singles